Figgis is a surname. Notable people with the surname include:

 Anthony Figgis (born 1940), British politician
 Darrell Figgis (1882–1925), Irish writer and politician
 Genieve Figgis (born 1972), Irish artist
 Jason Figgis, film director
 Jonathan Figgis, film director and producer
 Mike Figgis (born 1948), British film director, writer, and composer
 Neville Figgis (1866–1919), British historian, political philosopher and monk
 T. P. Figgis (1858–1948), British architect

See also
 Hodges Figgis, shop